Erik Johnson is an ice hockey player for the Colorado Avalanche.

Erik Johnson may also refer to:

Erik Johnson (infielder) (born 1965), baseball player
Erik Johnson (pitcher) (born 1989), baseball player
Erik Johnsen (born 1965), Norwegian ski jumper
J. Erik Jonsson (1901–1995), businessman and mayor of Dallas

See also
Eric Johnson (disambiguation)